Robert Dyer (1808–1887) was a minister in Newfoundland.

Robert Dyer may also refer to:

 Robert Dyer (Australian cricketer) (1860–1950), Australian cricketer
 Robert Dyer (English cricketer) (born 1959), English cricketer
 Robert Allen Dyer (1900–1987), South African botanist and taxonomist
 Robert Dyer (bomber), convicted in a 2001 extortion case in England

See also
 Bob Dyer (1909–1984), American-born vaudeville entertainer, radio personality and quiz show host